

List of Ambassadors

Guy Feldman 2016 - 2018
Uriel Palti 2013 - 2016
Moshe Ram 2007 - 2013
Noam Katz 2002 - 2007 
Arie Avidor 2000 - 2002
Itzhak Oren 1998 - 1999
Gadi Golan 1994 - 1998
Moshe Gilboa 1992 - 1994
Yissakhar Ben-Yaakov 1969 - 1973
Ram Nirgad 1966 - 1969
Chanan Yavor 1960 - 1963
Shlomo Argov 1960

References

Nigeria
Israel